Rincón de la Vieja is an active andesitic complex volcano in north-western Costa Rica, about  from Liberia, in the province of Guanacaste.

Toponymy
Its name means "The Old Woman's Corner", or "Old Woman’s Nook" a reference to a local legend about princess Curabanda whose lover Mixcoac, chief of a neighboring enemy tribe, who was thrown into the crater by her father Curabande, when he learned about their affair. She went on living on the side of the volcano, giving birth to a son. To be with its father, she threw her son into the volcano, too. She continued to live on the volcano and became a recluse living on the mountain, and was credited with powers of healing.

It erupted most recently in June 2021. The volcano has many fumaroles and hot springs on its slopes. It is formed by  felsic lava.

Rincón de la Vieja is one of six active Costa Rican volcanoes: the others are Poás, Irazú, Miravalles, Arenal, and Turrialba.

As of 2021, only Rincón de la Vieja, Turrialba and Poás are considered active.

Geothermal energy

There are many hot pools and areas of bubbling mud in two areas on the slopes of the volcano, indicating substantial reserves of geothermal energy. Investigations have been carried out into the feasibility of tapping these reserves, and the volcano is estimated to have a generating potential of 140 megawatts. However, as the area is protected within a national park, drilling was limited to test wells until 2001.

In 2013, the extension of the Las Pailas Geothermal Power Plant to 55 megawatt, financed in part by a credit from the European Investment Bank, was started.

Tourism
Trails extend from the Santa Maria ranger station and wind through the park, passing hot springs and waterfalls along the way. Mammals within the park include sloths, tapirs, kinkajous, pumas, jaguar, and both howler and spider monkeys.

Previously, hikers could climb to the crater and guides experienced in wildlife, birdwatching, geology and other interests are available.

Several lodges, resorts and hotels in the area offer hiking, forest canopy tours, horseback riding, river-rafting, all-terrain-vehicle riding and wall-climbing.

Activity

2010s 

 23 May 2017, eruptions occurred and lahars flowed through nearby rivers.
 11 June 2017, eruptions occurred and lahars flowed through nearby rivers.

2020s 

 4–6 April 2020, hydrothermal, gas, and steam eruption.
 19 April 2020, a  ash column eruption occurs which prompts the authorities to activate emergency protocols in the surrounding areas.
 1 June 2020, a  ash column eruption occurred at 5pm, activity has been ongoing since April.
 28 June 2021, a  ash column eruption occurred at 5:42 am. https://www.ticotimes.net/2021/06/28/rincon-de-la-vieja-volcano-registers-strong-eruption-2021

See also
 List of volcanoes in Costa Rica

References

External links

 Rincon de la Vieja, the backbone of Central America
 Costa Rican Vulcanologic and Seismologic Observatory: Rincón de la Vieja

Stratovolcanoes of Costa Rica
Subduction volcanoes
Active volcanoes
Mountains of Costa Rica
Complex volcanoes
Volcanic crater lakes
Geography of Guanacaste Province